Arnon Rosenthal is an Israeli-American neuroscientist, inventor and a biotechnology entrepreneur.

Rosenthal is an inventor and developer of the pain medicine Tanezumab, the migraine medicine Fremanezumab, the Alzehimer's drug Ponezumab and the target for the basal cell carcinoma medicine Vismodegib. Rosenthal founded the biotechnology companies Rinat Neuroscience Corporation in 2001, (acquired by Pfizer in 2006), Annexon, which develops anti complement medicines  for auto immune neuropathies and degenerative eye diseases, in 2011, and Alector, which develops innate immune (immuno-neurology) drugs for dementia and neurodegeneration, in 2013.

References 

Living people
Year of birth missing (living people)
Israeli neuroscientists
Hebrew University of Jerusalem alumni
Israeli chief executives
Israeli inventors